Phoenix FM, also known as Central Victorian Community Broadcasters Incorporated (CVCB), is an Australian community radio station based in Bendigo, Victoria.

History 
The inaugural meeting of Phoenix FM was held on 10 April 2007. Phoenix FM was granted a temporary licence for two weeks of test broadcasting from 7 January 2008. It was granted a second test broadcast period for two weeks from 8 to 21 June 2008. It was then granted a third test broadcast from 6pm on 28 September to midnight on 6 October 2008. A further extension to this was granted from October 2008 to March 2009 in a time-share arrangement with 89.5 Fresh FM. This occurred after a battle with the Australian Communications and Media Authority (ACMA), who were proposing to use the frequency used by both Phoenix FM and Fresh FM for political broadcasts.

Phoenix FM's first outside broadcast was a call of the Bendigo Pioneers game from Country Vet Oval, Golden Square. Phoenix FM began to stream their shows over the Internet in mid-2008.

Presenters
Lewis Adams hosts "The New Local" with Stephen Wright. He also presents "Live History".
Mark Noulton and Joseph Johnston present "Generous Servings of Soup". Noulton also presents "Batcat".
Stephen Wright presents "The Shoe Draw Sideshow Funky Dance Time Hour".

References 

Radio stations in Bendigo
Bendigo